The Gambrivii were a Germanic tribe. They are first mentioned by Strabo in Geographica as the Gamabrivii. He writes that they were connected to the Chatti, the Chattuari and the Cherusci. This means that they probably lived near the Weser. 

The Gambrivii are also mentioned by Tacitus in Germania.  He counted them as among the tribes who traced their origins to the Germanic god Mannus. Along with the names of Marsi, Suevi and Vandilii the name Gambrivii is mentioned by Tacitus as one of the old and genuine names of the Germanic peoples.  The Gambrivii are perhaps to be equated with the Sicambri.

See also
List of Germanic peoples

References

Sources
 Max Ihm: Gambrivii. In: Paulys Realencyclopädie der classischen Altertumswissenschaft (RE). Band VII,1, Stuttgart 1910, Sp. 691.
 Günter Neumann, Dieter Timpe: Gambrivi. In: Reallexikon der Germanischen Altertumskunde (RGA). 2. Auflage. Band 10, Walter de Gruyter, Berlin / New York 1998, S. 406–409.

Early Germanic peoples